RMS Caronia was a  passenger ship of the Cunard Line (then Cunard White Star Line). Launched on 30 October 1947, she served with Cunard until 1967. She was initially nicknamed the "Green Goddess"  after Liverpool's green and white "Green Goddess" trams, and the nickname stuck. She was one of the first "dual-purpose" ships, built both for 2-class transatlantic crossings and all 1st-class cruising. After leaving Cunard she briefly served as SS Caribia in 1969, after which she was laid up in New York until 1974, when she was sold for scrap. While being towed to Taiwan for scrapping, she was caught in  a storm on 12 August. After her tow lines were cut, she repeatedly crashed on the rocky breakwater outside Apra Harbor, Guam and broke into three sections.

History
After World War II, the Cunard White Star Line operated three ships on the Southampton—New York run. The famous RMS Queen Mary and RMS Queen Elizabeth operated a weekly express service, with the smaller and slower RMS Mauretania sailing as the third ship on the route. The company placed an order for a running mate to the Mauretania, a ship of similar speed and proportions for the transatlantic run. Ultimately this was not to be the role of the new ship, as Cunard White Star's executives decided that the new ship would be built primarily for cruising.

With that in mind, the new ship – soon to be named Caronia by Princess Elizabeth – received many different features from her Cunard White Star fleetmates. An outdoor swimming pool was a new thing, as was having bathroom / shower facilities in every cabin. However, unlike modern cruise ships, her accommodation was divided into two classes on transatlantic voyages; First and Cabin.

On cruises all accommodation was sold as one class although many staterooms, both on A deck and R deck, were usually allocated to Cabin Class. Even some cabins on B deck were sold on cruises. Both restaurants served the same menu in just one sitting and passengers were allocated to a restaurant dependent upon the locations of their staterooms. On short cruises to the Caribbean and South America, every cabin was offered for occupation and often, as on transatlantic crossings, there would be two sittings for luncheon and dinner.

To distinguish her from Cunard White Star's liners, the company decided to give her a different colour scheme. Instead of going for the then typical black hull with a white superstructure, Caronia received a unique livery of four different shades of "Cruising Green", making her a highly attractive and instantly recognizable vessel.

Another striking feature of the ship was her large single funnel, one of the largest ever installed aboard a ship. Similar to those of the later , this funnel easily caught the wind, making the ship somewhat difficult to handle. Caronia was the largest passenger ship to be built in Scotland after World War 2 until Queen Elizabeth 2 twenty years later.

Clara MacBeth lived full-time on the Caronia between 1949 and 1963, a span of 14 years.

1949–1959: a ship ahead of her time

The brand-new RMS Caronia made her maiden voyage on 4 January 1949 between Southampton and New York. Two more transatlantic crossings followed before the ship embarked on her first cruises from New York to the Caribbean. During her first years she spent most of the year on transatlantic crossings; only during the winter was she engaged in cruising. In 1951 she made her first world cruise. From 1952 onwards she made transatlantic crossings only in August and September, with the rest of the year dedicated to cruising; during one such cruise, she ran aground in Egypt on 12 March 1952 while transiting the Suez Canal. In May 1953 the Caronia made what was perhaps her most famous cruise, associated with the coronation ceremony of Queen Elizabeth II (who had christened the Caronia six years earlier).  The ship was used as a hotel, as most of the accommodation in the United Kingdom was fully booked.

Caronia ran aground at Messina, Sicily, Italy, on 31 May 1956, but was refloated the next day. Her annual refit in November 1956 saw Caronia modernised for southern cruising with air-conditioning outfitted through the entire ship. Her world cruise of 1958 saw her suffer the most serious accident of her career. Sailing slowly out of Yokohama harbour to avoid collision with a United States Navy vessel, she was driven by high winds against the harbor′s breakwater, causing serious damage to her bow and demolishing a harbor lighthouse in the process.  The United States Navy allowed Cunard to use their drydock at the Yokosuka yard for repairs to the Caronia.   That same year Caronias autumn cruise in the Mediterranean had to be cancelled due to political tensions in the Middle East.

1959-1967: Competition catches up

1959 saw Caronia making regular transatlantic crossings for the last time. Competition from the jet airliner meant there weren't enough passengers for her in the North Atlantic trade. From here her transatlantic crossings were repositioning voyages. The first each year being a Sterling Cruise, so called because all other Caronia cruises were paid for only in US dollars, and taking a southerly route via the Bahamas instead of the usual direct route. Decreased passenger numbers in the North Atlantic also meant that more of Cunard's liners were rebuilt into cruise use and received a similar green colour scheme to that of the Caronia, which in 1962 were established as the line's official cruise colours when RMS Mauretania was repainted for cruising (though not otherwise significantly adapted for the role). In 1963  the heavily rebuilt and renamed RMS Franconia and RMS Carmania followed suit. By this time the Caronia's itineraries had settled into a yearly pattern, each cruise having found its ideal individual place in the calendar.

By the early 1960s other shipping companies were catching up with Cunard and building their own purpose-built cruiseships, which in addition to being better equipped than the Caronia were better suited for cruising than she had ever been. To keep up with her newer competitors, Cunard decided that in November 1965 Caronia would be drydocked for ten weeks, new suites and a lido deck built, and her interior brought up to date. 1966 brought with it a seamen's strike in Britain, which upset the Caronia's itineraries badly. As a result of climbing operating costs, 1967 was the first year when the Caronia didn't profit her owners. Due to increased competition, Cunard decided to withdraw her from service at the end of the year. Fittingly, Caronia's last voyage for Cunard was a transatlantic crossing from New York to Southampton.

1968–1974: final years

In early 1968 the Caronia was sold to Star Shipping, a company owned by US and Panamian interests.  Renamed SS Columbia, she sailed to Greece for refitting.  Cunard had allowed Caronia to fall behind her maintenance schedule, and her engines needed a major overhaul. Replacement parts were ordered from a Greek company rather than from the original manufacturer.  Whilst she was being rebuilt Andrew Konstaninidis took control of Columbia, buying out the other owners of Star Line and renaming her the SS Caribia.  Her refitting was completed and she was given a new all-white colour scheme. She was registered in Panama, with her tonnage reduced to 25,794 GRT under Panamanian rules (which saved dock dues). February 1969 saw the Caribia embark on her first cruise from New York to the Caribbean.  The voyage was hindered by a malfunction in her waste system. Things turned for the worse on her second cruise, when an explosion in the engine room resulted in the death of one crew member and the severe scalding of another.  In addition the ship lost all electrical power for twenty hours before repairs allowed her to return to port.  The incident undermined public confidence in the vessel.  The Caribia limped back to New York, never to make a commercial voyage again.

Plans to revive the Caribia were considered for the next five years, but she remained docked in New York and her berthing debts continued to accumulate. Finally in July 1974 her owners gave in and sold the once great ship for scrap. German ocean tug Hamburg was entrusted with the task of towing the Caribia to a breaker's yard in Taiwan. Whilst near Honolulu the ship was in danger of capsizing; but repairs were made and they continued on. The two ships sailed into Typhoon Mary near Guam. On August 12, 1974, the Hamburg's generators failed and her crew were forced to cut the Caribia loose to save their own vessel. The storm's winds drove the lifeless ship against Apra Harbour's breakwater, where she was wrecked.

Being a danger to local shipping, the wrecked Caribia was swiftly cut up. Before that could take place, it was discovered that she had come to rest beside a Korean War-era landing craft sunk in that same location. The landing craft was loaded with tons of munitions, including 22 mm, 40 mm, 5-inch, and 8-inch shells. This required the careful removal of all of these materials over 5 months before removal of the Caribia could even continue. Her removal was all the more urgent because the Caribia hulk blocked Apra harbor's entrance. As Apra is the only deep-water harbor on Guam, this made resupply of many vital commodities (e.g., petroleum products) impossible or difficult. No commercial or military vessels could leave or enter the harbor until significant portions of her stern had first been removed. By January 1975, most of Cariba's stern had been removed, thus restoring access to and from the harbor. Afterwards, scrapping continued normally on her bow. What was left of her wreck was removed by late 1975. Her life ended just 25 years after she was commissioned. Despite being probably the most forward-looking ship of her time, she was in active service for only 19 years.

References

Further reading

External links 
 RMS Caronia Timeline (dedicated Caronia Website)
 Caronia Main Page on Bytenet
 Caronia (II) on Chris' Cunard Page

Further reading

 
 Sample Pages from RMS Caronia Cunard's Green Goddess by Bill Miller and Brian Hawley

 

Ships of the Cunard Line
Cruise ships
Passenger ships of the United Kingdom
Ships built on the River Clyde
1947 ships
Maritime incidents in 1952
Maritime incidents in 1956
Maritime incidents in 1974
Shipwrecks in the Pacific Ocean

ru:RMS Caronia